Martin Trevor Heinrich (born October 17, 1971) is an American businessman and politician serving as the senior United States senator from New Mexico, a seat he has held since 2013. He is the dean of New Mexico's congressional delegation.

A native of Fallon, Nevada, Heinrich lived much of his adulthood in Albuquerque, New Mexico, and maintains a residence there along with his work residence in Silver Spring, Maryland. He won the Senate seat vacated by retiring Senator Jeff Bingaman in 2012.

Early life and education
Martin Trevor Heinrich was born in Fallon, near Carson City, Nevada. He is the son of seamstress Shirley A. (née Bybee) and Pete C. Heinrich, a utility company lineman. His father was born in Waldenburg, Germany, as Heinrich Peter Karl Cordes and later took his stepfather Olaf Heinrich's surname. When he was naturalized as an American citizen in 1955, he changed his name again to Pete Carl Heinrich. Raised as a Lutheran, Martin Heinrich grew up in Cole Camp, Missouri. He attended public schools in Cole Camp, then moved to Columbia, Missouri, in 1989 to attend the University of Missouri. He graduated in 1995 with a Bachelor of Science in mechanical engineering. He left Missouri for Albuquerque to take graduate courses at the University of New Mexico.

Early career 
After a brief stint doing mechanical drawings, Heinrich worked as an AmeriCorps fellow in New Mexico.

From 1996 to 2001 Heinrich served as executive director of the Cottonwood Gulch Foundation, a New Mexico nonprofit organization dedicated to educating young people on natural science and the environment. In 2002 he founded his own public affairs consulting firm.

Heinrich served on the Albuquerque City Council from 2004 to 2008, including one term as city council president in 2006. As a city councilman, he said his goals were to reduce crime, raise the minimum wage and create new jobs. He also advocated the use of wind and solar power.

In February 2006 Governor Bill Richardson appointed Heinrich to be the state's Natural Resources Trustee.

U.S. House of Representatives

Elections

2008 

He originally planned to challenge five-term Republican incumbent Heather Wilson, but Wilson retired to run for the U.S. Senate seat vacated by retiring Republican Pete Domenici. Heinrich won the Democratic primary on June 4, 2008, defeating New Mexico Secretary of State Rebecca Vigil-Giron, State Health Secretary Michelle Lujan Grisham, and U.S. Army veteran Robert Pidcock, 44–25–24–8%.

In the general election Heinrich faced Bernalillo County Sheriff Darren White, whom Heinrich's campaign focused on linking to President George W. Bush. Heinrich also called for energy independence and an end to the war in Iraq. He defeated White, 56–44%, carrying three of the district's five counties: Bernalillo (56%), Sandoval (56%), and Valencia (53%). White won Santa Fe (64%) and Torrance (57%) counties. Upon his swearing in on January 3, 2009, Heinrich became the first Democrat to represent the district. It had been in Republican hands since New Mexico was split into districts in 1969 but has become increasingly friendly to Democrats in recent years; it has gone Democratic in every presidential election since 1992.

2010 

Heinrich was challenged by Republican Jon Barela, who told Politico he did not believe Heinrich reflected the district, saying he was too far left on budget and spending issues. During the 2010 campaign Roll Call reported that the Democratic Congressional Campaign Committee assigned a lobbyist to aid in the reelection campaigns of possibly vulnerable House members in fundraising, messaging and campaign strategy. Heinrich was elected to a second term, defeating Barela 52–48%, and carrying two of the district's counties: Bernalillo (53%) and Sandoval (51%). Barela won Santa Fe (67%), Torrance (61%), and Valencia (53%) counties.

Tenure

On January 14, 2009, the House Democratic freshmen elected Heinrich to a six-month term as their class president. He co-sponsored the Stop the Congressional Pay Raise Act, which would cancel an automatic $4,700 salary raise for members of Congress.

Health care
On March 21, 2010, Heinrich voted for the Patient Protection and Affordable Care Act (commonly called Obamacare or the Affordable Care Act). In 2017 he co-sponsored Medicare-For-All.

Abortion
NARAL Pro-Choice America PAC endorsed Heinrich in 2010.

Heinrich received a 100% score from NARAL in 2009.

Environment
Heinrich has identified as an environmentalist throughout his career. He served as executive director of the Cottonwood Gulch Foundation, a New Mexico nonprofit organization dedicated to educating young people on natural science and the environment, and founded his own public affairs consulting firm.

Later, as a member of the Albuquerque City Council, he advocated for the use of wind and solar power. In February 2006 Governor Bill Richardson appointed him to be the state's Natural Resources Trustee. He also served on the executive committee of the Sierra Club's Rio Grande Chapter. In August 2011 he received the Sierra Club's first endorsement of the 2012 election cycle. He opposes construction of the Keystone Pipeline. He supports cap-and-trade legislation. In April 2019 Heinrich was one of three Democratic senators who joined Republicans to vote to confirm David Bernhardt, a former oil executive, as Secretary of the Interior Department.

In late 2019, Heinrich was one of 14 senators to co-sponsor the Green New Deal, a policy introduced in the U.S. House of Representatives and U.S. Senate that would establish net-zero carbon emissions by 2050.

Same-sex marriage
After his 2012 Senate primary opponent, Hector Balderas, announced his support for same-sex marriage, Heinrich's staff released a statement to The New Mexico Independent newspaper stating, "Martin has supported gay marriage for some time. I just don't think he was asked about it. Thanks for asking!" He was an original cosponsor of Congressman Jerry Nadler's 2009 legislation to repeal the Defense of Marriage Act.

Gun law
Heinrich is an outdoorsman, hunter, gun owner, and former member of the National Rifle Association (NRA). The NRA endorsed him during the 2010 congressional election. At that time the NRA gave him a grade of A for his stance on Second Amendment rights. The NRA did not support Heinrich during his 2012 Senate campaign and he has since donated their 2010 contribution to charity.

Heinrich opposed legislation that would have reinstated the Federal Assault Weapons Ban. He also supported bills to create a national standard for the concealed carrying of firearms across state lines, co-sponsored legislation that would ease the restrictions on the sales of firearms across state lines, and called for the repeal of the Dickey Amendment, which prevents government research into curbing gun violence. He supports banning bump stocks and banning sales to anyone on the federal no-fly list.

Ojito Wilderness
In 2008 the New Mexico Republican Party criticized Heinrich for his work on the creation of the Ojito National Wilderness, which they said amounted to unregistered lobbying. Heinrich responded that the work was advocacy that did not require lobbying disclosure.

Armed forces
Heinrich was a member of the House Armed Services Committee. During his time in Congress he has maintained strong opposition to the war in Iraq, and supports a swift end of combat operations in Afghanistan. In 2011 he voted against the National Defense Authorization Act conference report because he objected to language requiring that suspected foreign terrorists be taken into custody by the military instead of civilian law enforcement authorities.

Committee assignments

 Committee on Appropriations
 Committee on Armed Services
 Subcommittee on Tactical Air and Land Forces
 Subcommittee on Strategic Forces
 Committee on Natural Resources
 Subcommittee on Energy and Mineral Resources
 Subcommittee on National Parks, Forests and Public Lands
Select Committee on Intelligence

U.S. Senate

Elections

2012 

Heinrich announced that he would leave the House to run for the United States Senate seat held by Jeff Bingaman, who retired at the end of his term. In March, Politico reported that Al Gore had signed a fundraising letter for Heinrich. Heinrich defeated State Auditor Hector Balderas in the Democratic primary. He defeated Republican Heather Wilson, his predecessor in Congress, in the November 6 general election, 51% to 45%.

2018 

Heinrich was reelected to a second term in 2018 over Republican Mick Rich and Libertarian Gary Johnson. He gained 54% of the vote to Rich's 30% and Johnson's 15%.

Tenure

116th Congress (2019–2021)
In November 2020, Heinrich was named a candidate for secretary of the interior in the Biden administration.

117th Congress (2021–present)
Heinrich was participating in the certification of the 2021 United States Electoral College vote count when Trump supporters stormed the U.S. Capitol. He left the chamber to make a phone call and saw that the rioters were overwhelming the Capitol Police. He returned to the chamber to tell people what he saw: "an out of control mob climbing over things, waving Confederate flags, just clearly bent on breaking into the west side of the Capitol." Along with other senators, Heinrich was evacuated from the Senate chamber to an undisclosed location. He called the attack an "assault on democracy" and blamed Trump. In the wake of the attack, Heinrich said invoking the Twenty-fifth Amendment to the United States Constitution and/or impeachment would be appropriate to remove Trump.

Gun laws
On April 17, 2013, Heinrich voted to expand background checks for gun purchases, and against regulating assault weapons.

In response to the 2017 Las Vegas shooting, Heinrich said that Congress should pass legislation to combat gun violence.

Health care
On September 27, 2013, Heinrich voted to restore funding for the Patient Protection and Affordable Care Act as part of an amendment to legislation funding government operations for 45 days, and which also omitted House-passed language prioritizing debt payments if Congress fails to increase the nation's borrowing limits.

Election security 
On December 21, 2017, Heinrich was one of six senators to introduce the Secure Elections Act, legislation authorizing block grants to states to update outdated voting technology as well as form a program for an independent panel of experts that would work to develop cybersecurity guidelines for election systems that states could implement, along with offering states resources to install the recommendations.

Energy
In February 2021, Heinrich was one of seven Democratic U.S. Senators to join Republicans in blocking a ban of hydraulic fracturing, commonly known as fracking.

Puerto Rico 
On March 16, 2021, Heinrich introduced a bill to grant Puerto Rico statehood.

Committee assignments
Heinrich served on the following Senate committees in the 118th Congress:
 Committee on Appropriations
 Subcommittee on Agriculture, Rural Development, Food and Drug Administration, and Related Agencies
 Subcommittee on Energy and Water Development
 Subcommittee on Interior, Environment, and Related Agencies
 Subcommittee on the Legislative Branch
 Subcommittee on Military Construction, Veterans Affairs, and Related Agencies (chair)
 Committee on Energy and Natural Resources
 Subcommittee on Energy
 Subcommittee on National Parks
 Subcommittee on Public Lands, Forests and Mining
 Select Committee on Intelligence
 Joint Economic Committee (vice chair)

In March 2019, Heinrich and Rob Portman co-founded the Senate Artificial Intelligence Caucus. On April 15, 2020, the Trump administration invited Heinrich to join a bipartisan task force on reopening the economy amid the COVID-19 pandemic.

Bipartisan survival trip
In 2014, Heinrich and Senator Jeff Flake traveled to Eru, a small island in the Marshall Islands. The Discovery Channel sent a film crew to document their trip and planned to air the film for a show called Rival Survival. Heinrich and Flake had to survive for six days with few resources, including no natural sources of drinkable water. After the trip, Heinrich told reporters that he and Flake, a Republican, decided to do it to demonstrate that politicians from different political parties can work together, in their case to survive.

Electoral history

Albuquerque City Council

U.S. House of Representatives

U.S. Senate

References

Further reading

External links

 Senator Martin Heinrich official U.S. Senate website
 Martin Heinrich for Senate
 
 

|-

|-

|-

|-

|-

1971 births
21st-century American politicians
American Lutherans
Lutherans from New Mexico
American people of German descent
Democratic Party members of the United States House of Representatives from New Mexico
Democratic Party United States senators from New Mexico
Living people
New Mexico city council members
People from Benton County, Missouri
People from Fallon, Nevada
Politicians from Albuquerque, New Mexico
Protestants from New Mexico
University of Missouri alumni